Fahad Shahnawaz (born 5 January 1982) is an Indian former cricketer. He played three first-class matches for Hyderabad in 2004. He has also played the prestigious Vizzy Trophy  which is the highest Inter-Universities platform for up-coming cricketers . Along with other distinguished tournaments like national under-22,Bucchi Babu, Moin-Ud-Dowla gold cup. After coming to United States of America he played in many cricket leagues around US like  Greater Dayton Cricket club, Eastern American Cricket League New York, Cricket League of New Jersey, and the North Texas Cricket Association. He was invited in 2013 for training in preparation for National Tournament in the New York Region. In September 2016 he played the Central USA premier cricket League for Dallas team Known as DCL Jaguars.

References

External links
 

1982 births
Living people
Indian cricketers
Hyderabad cricketers
Cricketers from Hyderabad, India